Álvaro Rafael González Luengo (born 29 October 1984), nicknamed "Tata" is a Uruguayan professional footballer who plays for Defensor Sporting as a midfielder. A Uruguayan international on 72 occasions since 2006, he represented his nation for one World Cup and three Copa América tournaments.

Club career

Defensor
González started his career in 2003 with Defensor Sporting Club in Uruguay. He represented the side until 2007, playing 122 games with 8 goals in all competitions.

Boca Juniors
In August 2007, he was transferred to the giant club Boca Juniors. In the Argentine team he played until 2009 scoring one goal against Vélez Sarsfield and winning the 2008 Apertura and the 2008 Recopa Sudamericana.

Nacional
In 2009, he returned to Uruguay but now playing for Nacional.

Lazio
In August 2010, he signed a three-year contract with Italian club Lazio. He made his Serie A debut on 22 September 2010 against Fiorentina. Álvaro González scored his first Serie A goal vs Brescia and celebrated his goal by mimicking a phone call back to Uruguay by taking out his right boot.

The 2012–13 season saw González as a protagonist in Lazio coach Petković's eyes, where he had been among the most consistent and played players. Petković played González in numerous roles in the 2012–13 season, from defensive midfielder to full back and right midfielder. Together with the national team, Álvaro González played over 50 games in the 2012–13 season proving his durability, consistency and also goal scoring where he managed to get on the scoresheet in Serie A, Coppa Italia and in the Europa League.

Loan to Torino
On 1 February 2015, Torino announced the signing of González on a six-month loan with a buyout clause.

Loan to Atlas
On 21 August 2015, Mexican side Atlas announced the signing of González on a full year loan with a buyout clause.

International career

González has won 49 caps for the Uruguay national football team. His debut for La Celeste came against Romania in May 2006.

After playing for the team during 2010 FIFA World Cup qualifying, he was omitted from the squad which went on the finish fourth in the tournament finals.

In 2011, he won the Copa América playing four matches, including the final against Paraguay. He went on to represent his country at the 2013 FIFA Confederations Cup, and made 12 appearances during the 2014 FIFA World Cup qualifying campaign.

On 2 June 2014, he was named in Uruguay's squad for the 2014 FIFA World Cup finals. He appeared as a second-half substitute in the team's opening match – a 3–1 defeat to Costa Rica in Fortaleza.

Career statistics

Club
Statistics accurate as of match played 1 October 2019.

International
Source:

International goals

|-
|1||2 September 2011||Metalist Oblast Sports Complex, Kharkiv, Ukraine||||1–1||2–3 (W)||Friendly
|-
|2||14 August 2013||Miyagi Stadium, Rifu, Japan||||4–1||4–2 (W)||Friendly
|-
|3||18 November 2014||Estadio Monumental David Arellano, Santiago, Chile||||2–1||2–1 (W)||Friendly
|}

Honours

Club
Boca Juniors
Primera División: 2008 Apertura
Recopa Sudamericana: 2008

Lazio
Coppa Italia: 2012–13

International
Uruguay
2011 Copa América: Winner

References

External links

Álvaro Rafael González – Argentine Primera statistics at Fútbol XXI  

 

1984 births
Living people
Footballers from Montevideo
Uruguayan people of Spanish descent
Uruguayan footballers
Uruguay international footballers
Association football wingers
Defensor Sporting players
Boca Juniors footballers
Club Nacional de Football players
S.S. Lazio players
Torino F.C. players
Uruguayan expatriate footballers
Expatriate footballers in Argentina
Expatriate footballers in Italy
Argentine Primera División players
Uruguayan Primera División players
Serie A players
Uruguayan expatriate sportspeople in Italy
2011 Copa América players
2013 FIFA Confederations Cup players
2014 FIFA World Cup players
2015 Copa América players
Copa América Centenario players
Copa América-winning players